CMML may refer to:
 Continuous Media Markup Language
 Consejo Mundial de Lucha Libre
 Chronic myelomonocytic leukemia